Sausi is a Rai Coast language spoken in Madang Province, Papua New Guinea.

Sausi also goes by the name Uya, which is an alternative name of Usu as well.

References

Rai Coast languages
Languages of Madang Province